Two bits or two-bit may also refer to:

 Quarter (United States coin), nickname "Two bits"

People
 Mr. Two Bits (born 1922), football fan of the Florida Gators football team
 Two-Bits Homan (born 1898), Henry Homan, professional American football player in the 1920s
 Two Bits Man, author of the column "Two Bits" in The Technique, Georgia Institute of Technology, US

Media
 Two Bits, a 1995 American film
 "Two bits", the response in the seven-note rhythm "Shave and a Haircut"
 Two-Bit Mathews, a character in the 1965 American novel The Outsiders by S.E. Hinton

See also
 "Two-Bit Manchild", a 1968 song written and performed by Neil Diamond
 Two Bit Monsters, a 1980 album by American singer-songwriter John Hiatt
 Two Bits & Pepper, a 1995 American film unrelated to the above
 2-bit (disambiguation)